Mathijs Paasschens (born 18 March 1996 in Rotterdam) is a Dutch cyclist, who currently rides for UCI ProTeam .

Major results
2018
 2nd Grand Prix Albert Fauville
 3rd Grand Prix des Marbriers
 4th Paris–Tours Espoirs
 5th Flèche Ardennaise
 6th Memorial Philippe Van Coningsloo
2019
 1st  Overall Kreiz Breizh Elites
1st  Points classification
1st Stage 2
 6th Paris–Camembert
 9th Volta Limburg Classic
2021
 10th Paris–Troyes
2022
 7th Overall Tour of Britain
1st  Mountains classification

References

External links

1996 births
Living people
Dutch male cyclists
Cyclists from Rotterdam
21st-century Dutch people